Rashnu is the Avestan language name of the Zoroastrian yazata of justice. Together with Mithra and Sraosha, Rashnu is one of the three judges who pass judgment on the souls of people after death. Rashnu's standard appellation is "the very straight."

In creation accounts 

In the Bundahishn, a Zoroastrian account of creation finished in the 11th or 12th century, Rashnu (Middle Persian: Rashn) is identified as an assistant of the Amesha Spenta Ameretat (Amurdad), "immortality". (GBd xxvi.115). In a subsequent passage, Rashnu is described as the essence of truth (arta/asha) that prevents the daevas from destroying material Creation. "Rashnu adjudges even the souls of men and women as to bad deeds and good deeds. As one says, 'Rashnu shall not see thither the rank of the judge who delivers false judgment.'" (GBd xxvi.116-117).

In other texts
In the Avestan Dahman Afrin, Rashnu is invoked in an address to Ameretat. According to the Denkard, the Duwasrud Nask - a legal manual now lost - contained passages extolling the supremacy of Rashnu. (Dk 8.16) In the Siroza ("thirty days") "the very straight Rashnu ... augments the world and is the true-spoken speech that furthers the world." (Siroza 18).

Holy days
The 18th day of every month in the Zoroastrian calendar is dedicated to Rashnu. The Counsels of Adarbad Mahraspandan, a Sassanid-era text, notes that on the 18th day "life is merry".

See also
Abatur, Mandaean uthra who weighs the souls of the dead to determine their fate

Ancient Iranian gods
Yazatas
Psychopomps
Justice deities